XHEV-FM is a radio station on 99.9 FM in Izúcar de Matamoros, Puebla, Mexico, serving Atlixco. It is known as La Magnifica FM, with a Regional Mexican format.

History

XEEV-AM 1330 received its concession on November 11, 1982. It was owned by José Elias Choza Abad and broadcast with 500 watts as a daytimer. Choza Abad sold the station to Roberto Ávila Rodríguez in 1993, and in 2015, CapitalMedia bought the station.

It was authorized for migration to FM in 2011, but promotions continued to list only 1330 AM for a number of years.

In 2017, Grupo ORO began operating the station on CapitalMedia's behalf and flipped it from grupera to romantic format as La Romántica, La Flor de Atlixco. With the transfer of operations, XHEV's programming began originating from studios in Atlixco.

On August 1, 2022, Grupo ORO ended operation and Capital Media resumed direct operation with Lokura FM. This only lasted until March 2023, when Tribuna Comunicación, also of Puebla, assumed operational control and installed its La Magnífica brand.

References

Radio stations in Puebla